Eliyahu Noah "Eli" Staiman, professionally known as L.E. Doug Staiman or simply L.E. Staiman, is an American musician, actor, comedian, and filmmaker. He was the frontman and founder of the Jewish pop punk band The Groggers, which he formed with guitarist Ari Friedman in 2010. Outside of The Groggers, he has performed with artists including Aryeh Kunstler, Benny Friedman, and Dave Days, and released several solo singles, including with the short-lived duo 3 Day Yuntif. In addition to music he has pursued filmmaking, directing music videos and comedy sketches for various YouTubers and making his feature film directorial debut in 2022 with Love Virtually, starring Cheri Oteri, Stephen Tobolowsky, and Paul F. Tompkins.

Early life
Staiman was born in Binghamton, New York. His family moved several times during his childhood, with Staiman attending day school at Talmudical Academy of Baltimore and Rabbi Alexander S. Gross Hebrew Academy in Miami, Florida; he later studied at Yeshivas Ner Yaakov in Israel.
After returning to America, he graduated from Touro College.

Career

The Groggers 

One of Staiman's early bands performed at Yeshiva University's Battle of the Bands, where he met guitarist Ari Friedman, then an undergraduate at the school. The two were later reintroduced at Queens College and briefly played together in a classic rock cover band called Steel Eagle. In 2010, Staiman recruited Friedman and several other musicians to film a video for a song he had written called "Get". After the video became a minor viral hit, Staiman officially assembled the group as The Groggers. Their debut album, There's No 'I' in Cherem, was released on August 29, 2011.

For the band's 2012 video "Jewcan Sam", Staiman received rhinoplasty from the video's co-producer, Miami plastic surgeon Dr. Michael Salzhauer. Following the song's release and subsequent controversy, the band went on a brief hiatus, during which Staiman moved to Los Angeles and pursued a solo career. However, the band returned later in the year with a song called "Mindy". Despite releasing three more singles from a planned second album, the album never materialized and the band has been inactive since 2015.

Other music 
Prior to forming The Groggers, Staiman was a longtime member of Aryeh Kunstler's touring band, the Aryeh Kunstler Band (AKB). Since 2012, Staiman has released a number of singles as a solo artist. He contributed guitar to Benny Friedman's 2015 single "Toda!", appearing in the video alongside Groggers bandmates Drew Salzman and Addison Scott. The same year, Staiman and Ira Silver formed the Jewish pop duo 3 Day Yuntif, who released their debut single, "Thank God It's Shabbos (TGIS)". In 2016, he collaborated with YouTuber Dave Days on a mashup of Adele's "Hello" and Foo Fighters' "Everlong". In 2018, Staiman released a new single, "Ghosted", as well as a cover of 5 Seconds of Summer's "Lie to Me".

Web content 
In addition to his own music, Staiman has also written, produced, and directed several music videos for other musicians, primarily on YouTube. These include Avery, Taylor Carroll, Bart Baker, Dave Days, Noey Jacobson and The Groggers themselves. He appeared in a 2014 BuzzFeed video entitled "Jews Decorate Christmas Trees For The First Time". In 2017, Staiman directed and co-wrote "Find Your Song", a music video promoting Shalhevet High School that featured student and Gotham actor David Mazouz. As of 2017, he was the official cameraman and editor for Mayim Bialik's YouTube channel.

Film and TV 
Staiman has had several small acting roles, beginning with a 2013 appearance on Brand X with Russell Brand as a pedophile name Morry Urple. He co-wrote and co-produced with director Zach Zorba Grashin the 2021 horror film Knifecop, starring Kane Hodder. He is set to make his directorial debut in 2022 with the film Love Virtually, which he also produced and co-wrote with Cheston Mizel and which stars Cheri Oteri, Stephen Tobolowsky, and Paul F. Tompkins.

Discography

With The Groggers 

There's No 'I' in Cherem (2011)

With 3 Day Yuntif 
"Thank God It's Shabbos (TGIS)" (single) (2015)

Solo singles 
"West" (2012)
"Like Crazy" (2014)
"The Rabbi's Daughter" (2015)
"I Like U" (2015)
"Bli Neder" (2015)
"The Outcome" (2016)
"Ghosted" (2018)
"Lie to Me" (5 Seconds of Summer cover) (2018)

Other credits 
2013: ScrobageTV, "Work Witch" (Halloween parody of "Work Bitch" by Britney Spears) – producer, lyrics, vocals
2014: Benny Friedman, "Toda!" – guitar
2015: Carli J. Myers, "All the King's Horses" – producer
2016: Dave Days, "Adele/Foo Fighters Mash Up" – guest vocals, guitar, drums
2016: Carli J. Myers, "Walls" – producer, composer
2019: Dove, "Send Me A Love" – recording

Filmography

Film

Web and TV
2013: Fantar the Fantastic (webseries) – editor, cinematographer

Acting 
2013: Brand X with Russell Brand (Episode: "Show 16") – Morry Urple
2014: Bart Baker, "Magic! - Rude Parody" – Magic! drummer
2014: Bart Baker, "Maroon 5 - Animals Parody" – Maroon 5 Bandmate
2014: The Walking Deader (short) – Dickless Fence Zombie
2015: Bart Baker, "Maroon 5 - Sugar Parody" – Maroon 5 Bandmate

Music videos

References

External links 

 
 
 
 

American Orthodox Jews
Musicians from Los Angeles
People from Hollywood, Florida
Living people
Touro College alumni
Jews in punk rock
Jewish songwriters
The Groggers members
People from Binghamton, New York
American filmmakers
American male actors
Year of birth missing (living people)